Skavlan is a surname. Notable people with the surname include:

Aage Skavlan (1847–1920), Norwegian historian
Einar Skavlan (1882–1954), Norwegian journalist, newspaper editor, theatre critic and theatre director
Fredrik Skavlan (born 1966), Norwegian television host, journalist, and cartoonist
Harald Skavlan (1854–1908), Norwegian railroad engineer
Jenny Skavlan (born 1986), Norwegian model, actress, television presenter, and author
Merete Skavlan (1920–2018), Norwegian actress, theatre instructor and director
Olaf Skavlan (1838–1891), Norwegian literary historian and playwright
Sigvald Skavlan (1839–1912), Norwegian priest, psalmist and educator